Travis is a surname. Notable people with the surname include:
 Abby Travis (born 1969), American bassist
 Bill Travis (born 1957), American photographer
 Cecil Travis (1913–2006), American baseball infielder
 Clay Travis (born 1979), American sports journalist
 Dave Lee Travis (born 1945), British radio presenter
 Debbie Travis (born 1960), Canadian television personality
 Edward Travis (1888–1956), British cryptographer and intelligence officer
 Eugene M. Travis (1863–1940), American politician and New York State Comptroller 1915–1920
 Francis Travis (1921–2017), American-born Swiss conductor
 George Travis (1741–1797), English clergyman
 Jody Travis (born 1965), American television personality, multiple kidnapping and attempted murder victim
 Joe Lane Travis (born 1931), American politician
 John Travis (disambiguation), multiple people
 Joseph Travis (born 1953), American academic
 Julius Travis (1869–1961), Justice of the Indiana Supreme Court
 Kylie Travis (born 1970), Australian actress
 Matthew Travis (fl. 1990s–2020s), American businessman and government official
 Maury Travis (1965–2002), American serial killer
 Merle Travis (1917–1983), American country and western singer
 Michael Travis (born 1965), American jamband drummer and member of The String Cheese Incident
 Michael Travis (soccer) (born 1993), South African footballer
 Nancy Travis (born 1961), American actress
 Randy Travis (born 1959), American country singer
 Reid Travis (born 1995), American basketball player
 Richard Travis (1884–1918), New Zealand soldier
 Richard Travis (actor) (1913–1989), American actor
 Robert F. Travis (1904-1950), United States Army Air Forces general
 Robert S. Travis (1909–1980), American politician
 Robert S. Travis Jr. (born 1947), American politician
 Ross Travis (born 1993), American football player
 Ryan Travis (born 1989), American football player
 Scott Travis (born 1961), American rock drummer
 Stacey Travis (born 1966), American actress
 Walter Travis (1862–1927), Australian-born American golfer 
 William B. Travis (1809–1836), commander of the Texian forces at the Battle of the Alamo

Surnames of English origin